Edward F. Dwyer (September 27, 1932 – December 8, 2007) was an American football player and coach. He served as the head football coach at St. Joseph's College of Rensselaer, Indiana from 1961 to 1964 and at Indiana Central College—now known as the University of Indianapolis—from 1967 to 1969, compiling a career college football coaching record of 11–47–2. Dwyer was selected by the Cleveland Browns in the 1956 NFL Draft.

Head coaching record

References

External links
 

1932 births
2007 deaths
American football ends
Indianapolis Greyhounds football coaches
Purdue Boilermakers football players
Saint Joseph's Pumas football coaches
Sportspeople from Camden, New Jersey
Players of American football from Camden, New Jersey